The 1st Ryder Cup Matches were held at the Worcester Country Club in Worcester, Massachusetts. The first competition was dominated by the United States who won by the then landslide score of 9–2 points. USA Captain Walter Hagen became the first winning captain to lift the Ryder Cup. Samuel Ryder, the competition's founder was unable to be present at Worcester Country Club for the inaugural event due to ill health at the time. Ted Ray was the first captain to represent the Great Britain team.

Format
The Ryder Cup is a match play golf event, with each match worth one point.  From this inaugural event through 1959, the format consisted of 4 foursome (alternate shot) matches on the first day and 8 singles matches on the second day, for a total of 12 points.  Therefore, 6 points were required to win the Cup.  All matches were played to a maximum of 36 holes.

Teams
Source: 

A sub-committee of the Professional Golfers' Association was appointed to choose the Great Britain team for the first official Ryder Cup. This consisted of Harry Vardon, J.H. Taylor and James Braid. In March 1927 an initial group of 9 players was selected to represent Great Britain. These consisted of the above 9 players but with Abe Mitchell instead of  Jolly. Later in March it was announced that Abe Mitchell would be the captain of the team. However, in May, his health gave some concern. It was eventually decided that he was unfit to travel. Later he was operated on for appendicitis.

Seven members of the team left on the Aquitania on May 21, Boomer being picked up in Cherbourg. Ray was appointed the new captain.  George Philpot, editor of the British Golf Illustrated magazine, was the team manager and travelled with the team. With the team a man short, the PGA Secretary Percy Perrins recruited Jolly who sailed on a later boat, the Majestic, and arrived in New York on May 31, four days after the rest of the team.

Friday's foursome matches

Saturday's singles matches

Individual player records
Each entry refers to the win–loss–half record of the player.

Source:

United States

Al Espinosa did not play in any matches.

Great Britain

George Gadd did not play in any matches.

References

External links

Ryder Cup
Ryder Cup
Ryder Cup
Golf in Massachusetts
Ryder Cup
Ryder Cup
Sports competitions in Worcester, Massachusetts